Alfredo Moreira Júnior (16 October 1917 – 10 April 1998), usually known as Zezé Moreira, was a Brazilian football player and manager who coached Brazil at the 1954 FIFA World Cup. He has the most coaching appearances in Fluminense's history, with 467 managed matches for the Tricolor.  His brothers also had a singular taste for football: Aymoré Moreira, winner of the 1962 FIFA World Cup and Ayrton Moreira, both of them successful coaches in the Brazilian football. In 1976, as Cruzeiro's manager, he won the Copa Libertadores.

Career 
Zezé Moreira was born in Miracema, Rio de Janeiro, Brazil.

As a footballer, he played for Sport Club Brasil, Palestra Itália (nowadays Palmeiras), Flamengo and Botafogo.

Zezé Moreira managed several clubs, like Fluminense, Botafogo, Cruzeiro, Sport Recife and Nacional of Uruguay. He was also the Brazil national team manager in 1952, 1954 and 1955.

Honours

Player 
Flamengo
 Campeonato Carioca: 1925, 1927

Palmeiras
 Campeonato Paulista: 1934

Manager 
Botafogo
 Campeonato Carioca: 1948

Fluminense
 Campeonato Carioca: 1951, 1959
 Copa Rio: 1952

Brazil
 Panamerican Championship: 1952

Vasco da Gama
 Torneio Rio-São Paulo: 1966

São Paulo
 Campeonato Paulista: 1970

Cruzeiro
 Campeonato Mineiro: 1975
 Copa Libertadores: 1976

Bahia
 Campeonato Baiano: 1978, 1979

Nacional
 Uruguayan Primera División: 1963, 1969

References
Zezé Moreira, ex-técnico da Seleção, morre no Rio - Jornal do Commercio Online (11 April 1998)

External links
 

1917 births
1998 deaths
Brazilian footballers
Brazilian football managers
1954 FIFA World Cup managers
Sportspeople from Rio de Janeiro (state)
CR Flamengo footballers
Sociedade Esportiva Palmeiras players
Botafogo de Futebol e Regatas players
America Football Club (RJ) players
Campeonato Brasileiro Série A players
Campeonato Brasileiro Série A managers
Brazilian expatriate football managers
Expatriate football managers in Chile
Expatriate football managers in Uruguay
Expatriate football managers in Portugal
Botafogo de Futebol e Regatas managers
Fluminense FC managers
Brazil national football team managers
Club Deportivo Palestino managers
Club Nacional de Football managers
CR Vasco da Gama managers
Sport Club Corinthians Paulista managers
Sport Club do Recife managers
São Paulo FC managers
C.F. Os Belenenses managers
Esporte Clube Bahia managers
Cruzeiro Esporte Clube managers
Canto do Rio Foot-Ball Club managers
Association footballers not categorized by position